Antonín Kraft (30 December 1749, Rokycany – 28 August 1820, Vienna) was a Czech cellist and composer. He was a close friend of Haydn, Mozart, and Beethoven.

Biography 
Kraft was born in the Bohemian town of Rokycany of a German Bohemian ethnic family which had assimilated into Czech. He received early musical education on the cello from his father before going to university in Vienna to study law. He soon obtained a position in the Imperial Hofkapelle. In 1778 he was appointed cellist in Prince Nikolaus Esterházy's orchestra, where he met and studied composition with Haydn. In 1783 Haydn wrote his second cello concerto in D (Hob. VIIb/2, Op. 101) for Kraft. After Esterházy died in 1790, his successor, Prince Anton Esterházy, dismissed most of the court orchestra. Kraft went to Vienna and became a founding member of the Schuppanzigh Quartet, where he helped establish the traditions of string quartet playing. He played in the Grassalkovich court and from 1796 was employed in the orchestra of Prince Joseph Franz von Lobkowitz. He died on 28 August 1820 in Vienna.

Kraft was considered one of the greatest cellists of his time and both Haydn's Cello Concerto No. 2 in D and the cello part in Beethoven's Triple Concerto were written for him, though his son Nikolaus Kraft is also claimed to have played the premiere of the latter.

As a composer, he wrote cello sonatas (six for cello with bass published as Op. 1 and 2) and a cello concerto (Op. 4). He also wrote various duos: for violin and cello (Op. 3), for cello and double bass and for two cellos (Op. 5 and 6).

Works 
 Op.1: 3 Cello Sonatas in C, G, D
 Op.2: 3 Cello Sonatas in B♭, G, C
 Op.3: 3 Grand Duos for Violin and Cello
 Op.4: Cello Concerto in C major
 Op.5: Cello Duo in G minor
 Op.6: Cello Duo in D major
 Op.7: Cello Duet on the theme from Mozart's Opera The Magic Flute ('Duettino Tamina and Papageno')
 Duets for Cello and Guitar
 Cello Concerto in C major "Seydel's Concerto"

References

External links 
 
 

1749 births
1820 deaths
18th-century Bohemian musicians
19th-century Czech musicians
19th-century Austrian people
18th-century classical musicians
19th-century classical musicians
18th-century classical composers
18th-century male musicians
19th-century classical composers
Austrian Classical-period composers
Czech classical composers
Czech male classical composers
Czech classical cellists
Esterházy family
Czech expatriates in Hungary
Austrian people of Czech descent
People from Rokycany
Pupils of Joseph Haydn
19th-century Czech male musicians